Frank Zephrin Bird   (March 10, 1869 – May 20, 1958), nicknamed "Dodo", was a 19th-century Major League Baseball catcher.  He played for the St. Louis Browns of the National League in 1892.

External links
Baseball-Reference page

1869 births
1958 deaths
19th-century baseball players
Major League Baseball catchers
St. Louis Browns (NL) players
Baseball players from Worcester, Massachusetts
Troy Trojans (minor league) players
People from Spencer, Massachusetts
Washington Senators (minor league) players